Nicolaj is a masculine given name. People with that name include the following:

Given name
 Nicolaj Agger (born 1988), Danish footballer
 Nicolaj Charles Sofus Clausen (1900 – 1989), Danish boxer known as Nick Clausen
 Nicolaj Bo Larsen (born 1971), Danish cyclist
 Nicolaj Hansen (1855 - 1932), Danish composer
 Nicolaj Jensen, Danish video game player known by his in-game name, "Jensen" (Jensen (video game player))
 Nicolaj Køhlert (born 1993), Danish footballer
 Nicolaj Kopernikus (born 1967), Danish actor
 Nicolaj Laegsgaard (born 1996), Danish cricketer
 Nicolaj Madsen (born 1988), Danish footballer
 Nicolaj Rasted (born 1985), Danish musician
 Nicolaj Ritter (born 1992), Danish footballer
 Nicolaj Schröder (born 1980), Swedish entertainer known as Nic Schröder
 Nicolaj Siggelkow, American economist
 Nicolaj Thomsen (born 1993), Danish footballer

Middle name
 Carl Christian Nicolaj Balle (1806–1855), Danish composer
 Peter Nicolaj Arbo (1768 – 1827), Norwegian businessman

See also

Nicola (name)
Nicolae (name)
Nicolai (given name)
Nicolao
Nicolas (given name)
Nicolau
Nicolau (surname)
Nicolay
Nikolaj

Masculine given names
Danish masculine given names